Jember Regency is a regency of East Java province, Indonesia. The population was 2,332,726 at the 2010 census and 2,536,729 at the 2020 Census. Its administrative capital is the urban area of Jember, which with 359,184 inhabitants in 2020 is the third largest urban area in East Java province (after Surabaya and Malang) but does not have municipality or city status as it is split between three separate districts.
Jember is famous for its tobacco farms and traditional food called tape which is made of fermented cassava.

Geography 
Jember Regency has a total area of 3,306.69 km2. It shares its borders with the regencies of Lumajang (to the west), Probolinggo, Bondowoso and Situbondo (to the north), and Banyuwangi (to the east). To the south lies the Indian Ocean, where the regency includes the island of Nusa Barong, located to the south of Java.

Administrative districts 
Jember Regency consists of thirty-one districts (Indonesian:kecamatan), listed below with their areas and their populations at the 2010 Census and the 2020 Census. All districts have the same name as the towns which provide their administrative centres. The table also includes the number of villages (rural desa and urban kelurahan) in each district, and its post code(s).

Notes: (a) includes the substantial offshore island of Nusa Barong (Pulau Nusa Barong, which forms the administrative village - or desa - of Puger Wetan) as well as 13 much smaller offshore islands. (b) includes 2 small offshore islands. (c) includes 12 small offshore islands. (d) except Karanganyar village, which has the post code of 68132. (e) includes 22 small offshore islands. (f) except Tegalrejo village, which has the post code of 68118. (g) except Plalangan village, which has the post code of 68113. (h) the last three districts (indicated by "(h)" above) together constitute the urban area of Jember town.

Climate

Demographics 

There were 2,332,726 people living in Jember Regency at the 2010 Census. The population has risen by 2020 to 2,536,729 - an average density of about 767.15 people/km2.

Ethnic backgrounds
Jember Regency is an heterogeneous area where many ethnic groups are mingled and live together. Most of its population are Javanese and Madurese people, with a small percentage of ethnic Chinese, Balinese,  Arabic and Indian.

Language
Most citizens speak the Javanese language or the Madurese language, and sometimes a mixed dialect of both Javanese and Madurese languages. Many citizen speak Indonesian for official and business purposes only, and to communicate with non-Javanese or non-Madurese people.

Jember Fashion Carnival
The Jember Fashion Carnaval is an annual event. In the tenth carnival in 2011, over 600 participants walked along the world's longest catwalk.

Airport
An expansion of dormant Notohadinegoro Airport has been verified for reuse/operational in June 2014. The airport now has 1,705 meters runway and ready to serve up to ATR 72/600.

The airport has been closed since April 2020 with no plans to reopen. High jet fuel prices and a lack of demand make Notohadinegoro Airport unprofitable for domestic airlines.

Notable people 
 Tiara Andini (born 2001), singer
 Bayu Gatra (born 1991), professional footballer

See also

 Culture of Jember
 SMK PGRI 05 Jember

References

External links
  
 Official website: 
 
 

Regencies of East Java